Trouble Backstairs (German: Krach im Hinterhaus) is a 1935 German romantic comedy film directed by Veit Harlan and starring Henny Porten, Else Elster and Rotraut Richter. It marked the directoral debut of Harlan, who had previously worked as an actor, and quickly developed as a leading director of Nazi Germany. It was based on a play by Maximilian Böttcher, and was remade in 1949.

It was shot at the Terra Studios in Berlin. The film's sets were designed by the art director Bruno Lutz and Hermann Warm

Cast

References

Bibliography 
 Bock, Hans-Michael & Bergfelder, Tim. The Concise CineGraph. Encyclopedia of German Cinema. Berghahn Books, 2009.
 Klaus, Ulrich J. Deutsche Tonfilme: Jahrgang 1935. Klaus-Archiv, 1988.
 Wistrich, Robert S. Who's Who in Nazi Germany. Routledge, 2013.

External links 
 

1935 films
Films of Nazi Germany
German romantic comedy films
German black-and-white films
1935 romantic comedy films
1930s German-language films
Films directed by Veit Harlan
German films based on plays
Tobis Film films
1930s German films
Films shot at Terra Studios